Fayad Mahmoud Hissain  is a Bahraini football defender who played for Bahrain in the Asian Cup.

References

External links

Year of birth missing (living people)
Living people
Bahraini footballers
Association football defenders
Bahrain international footballers
Footballers at the 1994 Asian Games
Asian Games competitors for Bahrain
1988 AFC Asian Cup players